Stenoma auricoma is a moth in the family Depressariidae. It was described by Edward Meyrick in 1930. It is found in Brazil.

The wingspan is about 18 mm. The forewings are greyish violet with the costal edge white. The hindwings are rather dark grey.

References

Moths described in 1930
Taxa named by Edward Meyrick
Stenoma